State Route 89A (SR 89A) is an  state highway that runs from Prescott north to Flagstaff in the U.S. state of Arizona. The highway begins at SR 89 in Yavapai County and heads northward from Prescott Valley, entering Jerome. From Jerome, the route then heads to Cottonwood and Clarkdale. The road then continues out to Sedona. The highway is notable for its scenic value as it winds over and through Mingus Mountain as well as passing through Sedona and the Oak Creek Canyon. The route then enters Coconino County soon after leaving Sedona. The highway proceeds to Flagstaff, where it crosses Interstate 17 (I-17) and I-40. The highway ends at I-40 Business in Flagstaff. What is now SR 89A became a state highway in the late 1920s as SR 79. The highway was extended and improved several times through 1938. SR 79 was renumbered to U.S. Route 89A (US 89A) in 1941 and then to SR 89A in the early 1990s.

Route description
SR 89A runs from its southern terminus in Prescott northward through the towns of Jerome, Cottonwood and Sedona to its northern terminus in Flagstaff. The highway is known for its scenic views as it passes through the Sedona area and Oak Creek Canyon.

Prescott to Jerome
SR 89A's southern terminus is at a junction with SR 89 north of Prescott near the Antelope Hills Golf Course and Ernest A. Love Field. The road heads east from the junction with SR 89 as the Pioneer Parkway, a four-lane divided highway with diamond interchanges at most intersections. It continues as a divided highway until it reaches Fain Road in Prescott Valley. The route continues beyond this intersection as a two-lane undivided highway. The only at-grade intersection in this stretch is a junction with Great Western Drive, near milepost 321.

As SR 89A moves to the northeast, it begins to ascend the Black Hills mountain range. ADOT has designated this section of SR 89A as the Mingus Mountain Scenic Road by ADOT. The roadway follows the terrain through a series of hairpin turns as it climbs in elevation. Once SR 89A reaches passes over the mountains, it begins its descent into the Verde Valley. During its descent, SR 89A enters the town of Jerome. In Jerome, the highway provides access to the nearby Jerome State Historic Park.

Jerome to Sedona

Upon exiting Jerome, SR 89A heads northeast through the Verde Valley. The highway also picks up the Historic US 89A designation on the south end of Jerome. Officially named the Jerome-Clarkdale-Cottonwood Historic Road by the Arizona Department of Transportation, Historic US 89A is one of only four state designated historic routes in Arizona, the others being Historic Route 66, Historic U.S. Route 80 and the Apache Trail Historic Road. The historic route was designated on May 13, 1992 by ADOT and is about 10 miles long.

After SR 89A and Historic US 89A enter the town of Clarkdale, SR 89A turns southeast at a roundabout with Clarkdale Parkway. The route continues toward the southeast through Clarkdale before entering the town of Cottonwood. There, the highway starts heading east at Cottonwood Street before reaching an intersection with Main Street. 

Historic US 89A, runs through the old downtown areas of both Clarkdale and Cottonwood. From the present day traffic circle between SR 89A and Clarkdale Parkway, Historic 89A continues north along Clarkdale Parkway, turning right at Main Street in Clarkdale, and then right again at Broadway. It continues past Tuzigoot National Monument, becoming Main Street in Cottonwood, and providing access to Dead Horse Ranch State Park. The route intersects Cottonwood Street, where the bypass route now intersects Main Street.

Following the intersection with Cottonwood Street, the road follows Main Street to an intersection with SR 260, which heads to the south toward Camp Verde and I-17. SR 89A then moves northeastward towards Sedona. As the highway leaves Cottonwood, it again becomes a divided highway north of Rocking Chair Road, heading into desert. Before reaching Sedona, SR 89A provides access to Red Rock State Park. 

The route remains a divided highway until it reaches Sedona, an arts and resort community known for its red sandstone formations. As it enters the city of Sedona, the route is known as the Si Birch Memorial Highway. The route continues east through Sedona, providing access to the Sedona Airport. SR 89A continues toward the east through Sedona to an intersection with SR 179, which heads south from this intersection through the southern part of Sedona to provide access to I-17.

Sedona to Flagstaff
Upon leaving Sedona, SR 89A becomes the state designated Sedona–Oak Creek Canyon Scenic Road. The highway heads northeast into a wooded area from Sedona and follows Oak Creek as it enters Oak Creek Canyon. SR 89A then curves to the north as it follows the creek and provides access to Slide Rock State Park along this portion of the highway. The roadway leaves the creek as it begins to ascend through the canyon. At the edge of the canyon, the Scenic Road designation ends. 

Upon ascending, the road goes through a series of hairpin turns (no trucks over 50 ft.) toward the Mogollon Rim. The roadway continues northward away from the canyon towards Flagstaff. It curves northeastward as it passes to the west of the Forest Highlands Golf Club. The route continues to the northeast towards I-17 near Flagstaff Pulliam Airport. 

SR 89A begins to run concurrently with I-17 as a freeway northward. The two highways continue north to an interchange with I-40, where I-17 terminates. The route continues north along Milton Road, to the west of Northern Arizona University before reaching its northern terminus at I-40 Business in Flagstaff.

History

The routing of SR 89A was first defined as a state highway in 1927 as SR 79 by the Arizona Department of Transportation (ADOT). At the time, only the portion from Prescott to Clarkdale was built, but the remaining portion to Flagstaff had been planned. By 1929, the highway had been extended north to Sedona, although the entire highway was not paved at this time. A graded dirt road was built the following year between Flagstaff and Sedona. The southern half of the section between Sedona and Flagstaff had been improved to a gravel road by 1934, with the northern half under construction. The next year, the construction on the northern section near Flagstaff was complete. The southern end of the highway near Prescott and the section between Jerome and Cottonwood had been paved by this time. By 1938, the entire route had been paved.

By 1941, the highway was redesignated from SR 79 to US 89A. Before the establishment of the route for I-17, the only route to Flagstaff was through Prescott. There were two routes available: US 89A through Jerome, Cottonwood, Clarkdale, Sedona and Oak Creek Canyon or north through Chino Valley via US 89 to US 66. The route was redesignated from US 89A to SR 89A in 1993.

Before 2001, SR 89A had veered south into the granite dells near Watson Lake, but due to an aging Granite Creek bridge and increased traffic, Yavapai County acquired the necessary land to realign SR 89A away from the dells and near the airport.

Junction list

Spur route

State Route 89A Spur (SR 89A Spur or SS 89A) is a  unsigned highway routed along Fain Road in Prescott Valley. The road was originally two lanes wide, but it has since been widened to a four-lane divided highway. Its primary purpose is as an eastern bypass around Prescott. The Central Yavapai Metropolitan Planning Organization has planned a freeway to connect SR 169 and SR 89A via Fain Road/SR 89A Spur as part of their 2025 regional plan.

Major intersections

See also

References

External links

SR 89A at Arizona Roads

089A
Arizona State Route 089A
Transportation in Yavapai County, Arizona
Transportation in Coconino County, Arizona
Flagstaff, Arizona
Prescott, Arizona
Prescott Valley, Arizona
Sedona, Arizona